Guélélinkoro is a village and seat of the rural commune of Djallon-Foula in the Cercle of Yanfolila in the Sikasso Region of southern Mali. The village is 40 km west of the town of Yanfolila and 4 km east of the Sankarani River that marks the border of Mali with Guinea.

References

Populated places in Sikasso Region